Events in the year 1689 in Norway.

Incumbents
Monarch: Christian V

Events

Arts and literature

Births
 25 March – Peder Hersleb, bishop (d.1757).

Deaths

See also

References